George & Paul is a Dutch-Flemish stop-motion comedy children's animated series. The series is Ka-Ching Cartoons, Pedri Animation, Beast Animation, NTR:, VRT-KETNET, and distributed by Distribution360 and The License Company.

Premise 
The series represents as two characters named George and Paul who are built of children's colored wooden blocks. They use their imagination to solve problems and also make things out of other wooden blocks.

The characters don't talk, but interact with each other and with a voice-over.

Broadcast 
The series aired on NTR's NPO 3 in the Netherlands,  VRT Ketnet in Belgium, ITVBe’s LittleBe in the UK, Daeyko Kids in South Korea, Jetsen Huashi Wangju in China, Hop in Israel,  YLE in Finland, RTV in Slovenia and TVNZ Kidzone in New Zealand.

Release 
The series streams at the Toronto International Film Festival as part of the event “Reel Rascals: Stories Delight”.

Trivia 
The series were inspired by the cartoony stop-motion animations created by the Oscar winning Hungarian animator George Pal.

References 

Belgian children's animated comedy television series
Dutch children's animated comedy television series
Stop-motion animated television series